Paraskevi may refer to:

People
 Saint Paraskevi (disambiguation)
 Parashqevi Qiriazi, a.k.a. Paraskevi D. Kirias (1880–1970), Albanian teacher 
 Voula Zouboulaki (1924–2015), Egyptian-Greek actress
 Evi Christofilopoulou (born 1956), Greek politician 
 Voula Patoulidou (born 1965), Greek hurdler and long jumper
 Paraskevi Tsiamita (born 1972), Greek jumper
 Paraskevi Papachristou (born 1989), Greek athlete

Places in Greece
Paraskevi, Achaea, a village in Achaea
Paraskevi, Grevena, a village in Grevena

See also
 List of saints named Paraskevi
 Agia Paraskevi (disambiguation), for places and churches in Greece
 Sveta Petka (disambiguation), Bulgarian, Macedonian and Serbian name for Parascheva of the Balkans
 Paraskevas (given name)
 Paraskevas (surname)
 Praskovya

Greek feminine given names